Stephanie Price (born 17 July 1972) is an Australian hurdler. She competed in the women's 400 metres hurdles at the 2000 Summer Olympics.

References

External links
 

1972 births
Living people
Athletes (track and field) at the 2000 Summer Olympics
Australian female hurdlers
Olympic athletes of Australia
Athletes from Sydney